Twenty One Pilots have released six studio albums, the most recent being Scaled and Icy (2021). While the original line-up had included bassist Nick Thomas and drummer Chris Salih, Josh Dun replaced Salih on drums and percussion in 2011, and remains the only other member of the band aside from frontman Tyler Joseph and their touring members.

A list of albums by Twenty One Pilots and their respective chart listings can be found on the Twenty One Pilots discography article.

Songs recorded and released by Twenty One Pilots

Unreleased songs recorded by Twenty One Pilots

Level of Concern Alternate Reality Game flash drive
In 2020, Twenty One Pilots launched the Level of Concern Alternate Reality Game, and the first 500 individuals to successfully complete it were gifted a flash drive containing exclusive images, videos, and unreleased demo tracks from 2011.

All of the tracks were eventually leaked to YouTube, many of which had never been heard before. Most of the audio files lack vocals. The folder the tracks were in was titled "Old Demos 2011." The filenames of the tracks are as follows: "bellkit.mp3", "Blue Score 002.mp3", "Classic.mp3", "Creepy.mp3", "Disco.mp3", "pianobeat.mp3", "Regg.mp3", "Techno2.mp3", "webseries001.wav", "webseries002.wav", "webseries003.wav", "webseries004.wav", "webseries005.wav", and "webseries006.wav".

The track "Blue Score 002" has been used as filler music for the Emotional Roadshow World Tour.

See also
 Twenty One Pilots
 Twenty One Pilots discography
 Tyler Joseph discography

References

Lists of songs recorded by American artists